This is a list of fossiliferous stratigraphic units in Sudan.



See also 
 Lists of fossiliferous stratigraphic units in Africa
 List of fossiliferous stratigraphic units in Eritrea
 List of fossiliferous stratigraphic units in Ethiopia
 Geology of Sudan

References

Further reading 
 G. R. Demathieu and P. Wycisk. 1990. Tetrapod trackways from southern Egypt and northern Sudan. Journal of African Earth Sciences 10(3):435-443
 A. A. M. Eisawi, A. B. Ibrahim, O. B. A. Rahim and E. Schrank. 2012. Palynozonation of the Cretaceous to Lower Paleogene Strata of the Muglad Basin, Sudan. Palynology 36(2):191-207
 A. E. Marks and A. Mohammed-Ali. 1991. The Late Prehistory of the Eastern Sahel. Southern Methodist University Press, Dallas, TX
 J.-C. Rage and C. Werner. 1999. Mid-Cretaceous (Cenomanian) snakes from Wadi Abu Hashim, Sudan: The earliest snake assemblage. Palaeontologia Africana 35:85-110
 O. W. M. Rauhut. 1999. A dinosaur fauna from the Late Cretaceous (Cenomanian) of northern Sudan. Palaeontologia Africana 35:61-84
 K. A. O. Salih, D. C. Evans, R. Bussert, N. Klein, M. Nafi and J. Müller. 2016. First record of Hyposaurus (Dyrosauridae, Crocodyliformes) from the Upper Cretaceous Shendi Formation of Sudan. Journal of Vertebrate Paleontology 36(1):e1115408:1-9
 J. H. Schroeder. 1985. Sparry calcite cements in Miocene corals from Khor Eit (N.E. Sudan). Proceedings 5th International Coral Reef Symposium Tahiti 3:283-288

Sudan
Paleontology in Sudan
 
Fossiliferous stratigraphic units
Fossil